Stigmella resplendensella is a moth of the family Nepticulidae. It is found in North America, including Kentucky.

The wingspan is about 6 mm.

The larvae feed on Celtis occidentalis. They mine the leaves of their host plant.

External links
Nepticulidae of North America
A taxonomic revision of the North American species of Stigmella (Lepidoptera: Nepticulidae)

Nepticulidae
Moths of North America
Moths described in 1875